István Sarlós (30 October 1921 – 19 June 2006) was a Hungarian politician, who served as Speaker of the National Assembly of Hungary between 1984 and 1988.

He was born in Budapest. His parents (István Scheithauer, later Sarlós and Erzsébet Till) were members of the Social Democratic Party since 1922. His father was deportated by the Arrow Cross Party's men because of his participation in the rebel movements. He died in the Dachau concentration camp in 1944. Sarlós' brother, Ferenc held the position of Chief of the Budapest District XVII (Rákosmente) Police.

He was a member of the National Assembly of Hungary from 1963 to 1990. In 1966 he was appointed member of the Central Committee of the Hungarian Socialist Workers' Party. He also held the position of deputy chairman of the National Council of the Patriotic People's Front. He was the chief editor of the Népszabadság between 1970 and 1974. From 1974 to 1982 he served as general secretary of the National Council of the Patriotic People's Front. He became a member of the communist party's Political Committee too.

Between 1982 and 1984 he served as Deputy Chairman of the Council of Ministers of the People's Republic of Hungary. After that he was appointed legislative speaker. He resigned in 1988 and became Deputy Chairman of the Hungarian Presidential Council. He retired from the politics after the end of Communism.

Sarlós died on 19 June 2006 at the age of 84.

References
 István Sarlós Biography by Judit Villám
 Elhunyt Sarlós István, az Országgyűlés egykori elnöke (Origo.hu)

1921 births
2006 deaths
Politicians from Budapest
Members of the Hungarian Working People's Party
Members of the Hungarian Socialist Workers' Party
Speakers of the National Assembly of Hungary
Members of the National Assembly of Hungary (1963–1967)
Members of the National Assembly of Hungary (1967–1971)
Members of the National Assembly of Hungary (1971–1975)
Members of the National Assembly of Hungary (1975–1980)
Members of the National Assembly of Hungary (1980–1985)
Members of the National Assembly of Hungary (1985–1990)